Scotshouse is a small agricultural village in the parish of Currin in County Monaghan, Ireland. It is roughly three miles east of where the counties of Cavan, Fermanagh and Monaghan meet.

Scotshouse is in the townland of Aghnahola. Finn Bridge, a border crossing on the Finn River, is west of Scotshouse.

Churches
There are two churches in Scotshouse; St. Andrew's Church (Church of Ireland) and the Church of the Immaculate Conception (Roman Catholic).

The former, St. Andrew's Church, celebrated its 200th anniversary in 2010. It contains a memorial stained glass window for those who died in the First World War and a memorial plaque to Ernest Waldron King, an assistant purser with the White Star Line who died when the Titanic sank. The church and its graveyard are both protected regional structures (reference numbers 41401610 and 41401615, respectively).

The Church of the Immaculate Conception, built in 1924, is a gable-fronted structure of Romanesque appearance. The church has a stained glass window and a carved plaque with a Celtic cross motif. It is a protected regional structure (reference numbers 41401608).

People 
 Thomas Fitzpatrick (1918–2006), former chairman of the Dáil
 Hugh MacMahon (1660–1737), Archbishop of Armagh
 Éamonn Ó Ciardha, lecturer in University of Ulster in Magee Campus, Derry City
 Séamus P. Ó Mórdha (1915–2005), professor of Irish in St Patrick's College, Dublin

See also
List of towns and villages in Ireland

References

Towns and villages in County Monaghan